The 1976–77 British Home Championship launched a brand new era in Home Nations football during its final game, when jubilant Scottish fans invaded the pitch at Wembley Stadium following their team's 2-1 victory. Unlike a similar occasion in 1967, family football had given way to hooliganism and extensive damage was done to the stadium and riots in London throughout the night followed the occasion. It was events like this which eventually led to the tournament's cancellation in 1984.

The tournament itself was an open affair, with an opening victory for England cancelled out by a Scottish win over Northern Ireland and English defeat to Wales. The Welsh stood a good chance of winning the tournament outright for the first time since 1937, but could not beat the Irish in their final match, and ended up in a rare second-place position. The Scots and English thus faced each other in the final match knowing the winner would take the trophy, the Scots achieving a victory on England's home ground to take the trophy for the second year in a row and demonstrate their dominance in British football. The match was followed by a mass pitch invasion by Scottish supporters.

Table

Results

Goalscorers
3 goals
 Kenny Dalglish
2 goals
 Mick Channon
 Gordon McQueen
1 goal
 Dennis Tueart
 Chris McGrath
 Sammy Nelson
 Nick Deacy
 Leighton James

References

External links
Full Results and Line-ups

1977
1977 in British sport
1976–77 in Northern Ireland association football
1976–77 in Welsh football
1976–77 in English football
1976–77 in Scottish football